William Devey (12 April 1865 – 10 June 1935) was an English professional footballer who played as a centre forward for Small Heath (renamed from Small Heath Aliiance in 1888) in the Football Alliance and for a variety of Midlands clubs in the Football League and outside it.

Football career
He was Small Heath Alliance's leading scorer for their first two seasons in the Football Alliance (1889–90 and 1890–91) before moving to Wolverhampton Wanderers where he became their leading scorer in the next Football League season.

Professional Baseball

In 1890 Devey played professional baseball for Aston Villa in the National League of Baseball of Great Britain.

Family
He was one of five brothers who all played professional football, Ted and Will for Small Heath and Jack, Harry and Bob for Aston Villa. Another brother, Abel, was a cricketer with Staffordshire.

References

1865 births
1935 deaths
Footballers from Birmingham, West Midlands
English footballers
Association football forwards
Aston Unity F.C. players
Birmingham City F.C. players
Wolverhampton Wanderers F.C. players
Aston Villa F.C. players
Walsall F.C. players
Burton Wanderers F.C. players
Notts County F.C. players
Darlaston Town F.C. players
English Football League players
Football Alliance players
English baseball players